Grande-Île is the largest of the islands of Chausey located near the Channel Islands off the coast of Normandy in France. It has a population of 30.

References

Islands of Metropolitan France
Islands of Normandy
Landforms of Manche
Landforms of Normandy